A beauty salon or beauty parlor is an establishment that provides cosmetic treatments for people. Other variations of this type of business include hair salons, spas, day spas, and medical spas.

Beauty treatments
Massage for the body is a beauty treatment, with various techniques offering benefits to the skin (including the application of beauty products) and increasing mental well-being. Hair removal is offered at some beauty salons through treatments such as waxing and threading. Some beauty salons also style hair instead of requiring clients to go to a separate hair salon. Some also offer sun tanning via tanning beds.

Another popular beauty treatment specific to the face is known as a facial. The perceived effects of a facial mask treatment include revitalization, healing, or refreshment of the skin. They may yield temporary benefits depending on environmental, dietary, and other skincare factors. Although customers seek out these services for anti-aging or anti-inflammatory results, there is little to no objective evidence that there are any long-term benefits to the various available facial treatments. 

Specialized beauty salons known as nail salons offer treatments such as manicures and pedicures for the nails. A manicure is a treatment for the hands that involves trimming and filing of the fingernails and softening the cuticles in preparation for the application of nail polish. A pedicure is a treatment for the feet that involves trimming and filing of the toenails in preparation for the application of nail polish, as well as the softening or removal of calluses.

Industry

United States 
Beauty salons have proven to be a recession-proof industry across the United States. Although sales had declined from 2008 highs due to the Great Recession, they remain robust with a long-term positive forecast. Despite the tendency for consumers to be more price-conscious during recessions, spending continued to increase. With rising per capita incomes across the United States since 2015, beauty salons boomed, generating $56.2 billion in the United States. Hair care was the largest segment, with 86,000 locations. Skincare was expected to generate $21.09 billion in revenue by 2023, growing annually by 3.91%. This growth was driven in part by increasing awareness of the importance of skin care among American women, but also specifically due to an increase in the market for men. In 2020, the market was distributed widely across America, with a concentration in the Northeast and Midwest. There was also a growing trend in boutique salons popping up and leveraging online marketing to gain customers and compete with the franchise chains. In 2014, the US Labor Department estimated employment in the United States increased 20% between 2008-2014, with the greatest employment growth from skincare specialists. Beauty salons employ cosmetologists specializing in general beautification techniques. Cosmetology licensing requirements vary from state to state and depend on which specific license type is desired: general cosmetologist, hair stylist, esthetician, manicurist, barber, electrologist, or other.

India 
Beauty parlors employed 3.4 million people across India in 2013. The industry was expected to employ 12.1 million workers by 2022. Services typically include facials, skin-lightening bleaches, waxing, hair coloring, and hair straightening.

References

 
Cosmetics
Fashion
Personal care and service occupations